Free Solo is a 2018 American documentary film directed by Elizabeth Chai Vasarhelyi and Jimmy Chin that profiles rock climber Alex Honnold on his quest to perform a free solo climb of El Capitan in Yosemite National Park in June 2017.

The film premiered at the Telluride Film Festival on August 31, 2018, and also screened at the 2018 Toronto International Film Festival, where it won the People's Choice Award in the Documentaries category. It was released in the United States on September 28, 2018 and grossed over $28 million.

The film received acclaim from critics and numerous accolades, including winning Best Documentary Feature at the 91st Academy Awards.

Synopsis 
Climber Alex Honnold has been dreaming of free-soloing the  rock wall of El Capitan in Yosemite National Park, a feat no-one has been able to perform. No climber has ever completed a big-wall free solo at such a grade of difficulty in rock climbing history. Honnold, who has completed Freerider several times but with protection equipment, is a shy loner, who lives in his van with then-girlfriend Sanni McCandless. 

Alex goes climbing with Sanni, but while Sanni is feeding the rope through a grigri, she makes a mistake in which the rope is not fed through the grigri, and Alex falls. He visits a physician, where it is revealed he has a compression fracture. Alex then admits wanting to break up with Sanni. In the summer of 2016, Alex and Tommy Caldwell are climbing in Morocco in preparation for his free solo. The crew also prepares, discussing where to place cameras to best capture Alex’s climb while minimizing distractions and interference. Producer Jimmy Chin discusses the ethical dilemma of creating this documentary knowing Alex may die on camera. Alex also receives an MRI in order to understand his brain’s response to fear.

In the fall of 2016, Alex sprains his ankle while climbing the "Freeblast Slab" on El Capitan with equipment. Although his foot is swollen, Alex continues to climb in fear of his schedule being delayed. During Halloween, Alex and Sanni visit Tommy and his wife and children for carving pumpkins. This prompts Alex to describe his upbringing: the word “love” was not used in his household, as his father lacked the ability to form emotional bonds. Alex and Tommy eventually rappel down El Capitan, and Alex outlines his route, discussing the areas about which he is apprehensive: one section offers him two alternative pathways he calls "The Teflon Corner", a right-angled section with a smooth slippery surface, or "The Boulder Problem", a particularly intricate piece of the rock wall that he must finish either with a jump or a wide "karate kick" stance. Both the crew and Sanni suggest abandoning the plan, and Alex admits that he does not want his friends to see him die if he falls while free soloing; he finds out about the death of Ueli Steck, and reflects on his own risk-taking. In a trial run, Alex climbs El Capitan with equipment but stops after The Freeblast Slab. Jimmy as a result grows apprehensive of filming Alex, fearful it will put unnecessary pressure on him.

On June 3, 2017, Alex begins his free solo climb of El Capitan; Sanni leaves and expresses her apprehensions. As Alex is climbing, the crew narrates his progress, and watches nervously as Alex completes The Boulder Problem; one cameraman turns away. Alex continues with his climb, and completes the free solo, and celebrates at the top with Jimmy and Sanni over a phone call.

The documentary ends with information on the climb—Alex completed it in 3 hours and 56 minutes—and Alex contemplating his next steps.

Production
Prior to filming, directors Vasarhelyi and Chin struggled with the ethical ramifications and decisions behind creating Free Solo knowing Honnold may die on camera. They ultimately decided to go through with the film and devoted some time to documenting its own production process, with director Jimmy Chin and his camera crew (all experienced climbers themselves) discussing the challenge of not endangering climber Alex Honnold by distracting him or pressuring him to attempt the climb at all. According to director Elizabeth Chai Vasarhelyi, filming while not endangering Honnold was achieved with careful planning and practice. As the cameramen were all climbers, they were able to effectively capture Honnold’s climb from different vantage points. The production team captured 700 hours of footage using 12 cameras. This included cameramen on the ground, cameramen on the cliff face, remote trigger cameras, and a helicopter with a 1,000mm lens to capture the 4k video. Wireless mics, however, could not be used to record sound from Honnold due to his distance from the cameras. As a result, the filmmakers created a special recording device and had Honnold carry it inside his chalk bag.

The film was made by National Geographic Partners, which at the time of the film's release was majority-owned by 21st Century Fox, with the remainder owned by the National Geographic Society.

Release 
Free Solo premiered in the United States on August 31, 2018 at the Telluride Film Festival and in Canada on September 9, 2018, at the Toronto International Film Festival. It has been shown at multiple film festivals internationally since then. Free Solo was later released in theatres in the USA on September 28, 2018.

Reception

Box office
Free Solo grossed $17.5 million in the United States and Canada, and $11.1 million in other territories, for a total worldwide gross of $28.6 million.

The film made $300,804 from four theaters in its opening weekend, surpassing Eighth Grade and An Inconvenient Sequel, respectively, for the highest per-venue average of 2018 and of a documentary all-time with $75,201. It expanded to 41 theaters in its second weekend, making $562,786. The film grossed $859,051 from 129 theaters in its third weekend and $1 million from 251 theaters in its fourth weekend. During its fifth weekend, it earned $1.06 million from 394 theaters, bringing the total box office gross to over $5 million.

Critical response
The website's critical consensus reads, "Free Solo depicts athletic feats that many viewers will find beyond reason – and grounds the attempts in passions that are all but universal." On Metacritic, the film has a weighted average score of 83 out of 100, based on 25 critics, indicating "universal acclaim".

Writing for Variety, Peter Debrudge praised the pacing of the documentary: "Apart from a slow stretch around the hour mark, the filmmakers keep things lively (with a big assist from Marco Beltrami's pulse-quickening score, the nail-biting opposite of Tim McGraw's soaring end-credits single, "Gravity")." Richard Lawson of Vanity Fair called the film "bracingly made" and thought the filmmakers properly conveyed the challenges and dangers faced by Honnold in his endeavors: "Free Solos detailed, transfixing portrait of their hero will at least show some sort of barrier to entry, communicating to those eager wannabes that very few people indeed are built quite like Alex Honnold. And thank goodness, in a way, for that."

Michael Hale, London-based journalist for Sight and Sound, praised the filming techniques and the resulting effect. He argued that an image reminiscent of Greek mythology is evoked in Alex Honnold as the height and scale of El Capitan is captured. Film critic for the Globe and Mail John Doyle similarly praised the film, focusing on the “texture” of Free Solo. He specifically praised the tension and intensity when Honnold repeatedly risked death, along with the relatability of Honnold and his girlfriend. Similarly, journalist Sam Wollastan argued that Free Solo effectively captures an amazing athletic feat, the emotional development of Honnold, and the budding romance between Honnold and McCandless. The emotional development is further praised by The Times journalist Jane Mulkerrins, who remarks on the duality of the documentary as it examines the preparation and climb of Alex Honnold along with his relationship with girlfriend Sanni McCandless: “[Free Solo] captures the death-defying climb with vertigo-inducing camerawork. We see Honnold getting ready for the climb… At the same time, the armour of invincibility he's built up over the years fractures when he begins to fall in love with Sanni.”

Scholarly analysis 
Georgetown University professor of English and Film and Media studies Caetlin Benson-Allott argues that Free Solo infringes upon expectations of viewers when Alex Honnold was frequently and unexpectedly at risk to die: “I could no longer trust Vasarhelyi and Chin to deliver the safe spectatorial experience I’d expected, once they’d acknowledged that they were equally committed to filming their subject’s death." Benson-Allott acknowledges his implied death as a mechanism to achieve certain emotional effects, but remarks on its minimal focus on women. Director Elizabeth Chai Vaserhelyi and girlfriend Sanni McCandless, for instance, are reduced to supporting roles, according to Benson-Allott, while Jimmy Chin is highlighted and depicted as “Free Solos sole author." Furthermore, Alex Honnold’s depiction ties into gendered stereotypes, argues Benson-Allott: “Not all extreme athletes are men, yet the self-destructive masculinity of these athletes is also imposed on their spectators." These gender-stereotypes are reinforced, contends Benson-Allott, when Honnold criticizes his girlfriend Sanni McCandless for “wanting to be ‘happy and cozy’ rather than pursuing a life-threatening goal."

These analyses are shared by Simon Fraser University professor of History and Geography Joseph Taylor. In his analysis, Taylor remarks on the gendered stereotypes and the contrast between Honnold and McCandless, claiming that Free Solo employs a “hypermasculine narrative”. Taylor also argues that “the soul of the documentary” is the looming possibility of Honnold’s death and the coping mechanisms of his friends and coworkers. Honnold’s lack of fear in the face of likely death, for instance, intimidates his friends and family, eliciting ethical dilemmas and constant apprehensions. Taylor echoes Benson-Allott in the depiction of Honnold's challenges and risks throughout the film: “Make no mistake: we are watching the commodification of actuarial suicide."

Accolades

References

External links

2018 films
Primetime Emmy Award-winning broadcasts
American sports documentary films
Best Documentary Feature Academy Award winners
Documentary films about climbing
Films directed by Elizabeth Chai Vasarhelyi
Films directed by Jimmy Chin
Films scored by Marco Beltrami
Films set in California
Films shot in California
National Geographic Society films
Self-reflexive films
Yosemite National Park
2010s English-language films
2010s American films
Free solo climbing